Manilkara valenzuelana is a species of tree or tall shrub in the Sapodilla family. It is found in coastal and subcoastal semi-deciduous forests of Cuba (Pinar del Río and Oriente), the Dominican Republic, Haiti, and possibly Puerto Rico. Its habitat has been declining rapidly under pressure from charcoal makers, logging, and the clearing of forest for human habitation.

References

valenzuelana
Plants described in 1850
Vulnerable plants
Flora of Cuba
Flora of the Dominican Republic
Flora of Haiti
Taxonomy articles created by Polbot